Rhyzobius ventralis, common names including black lady beetle, gumtree scale ladybird, is a ladybird species endemic to Tasmania and all the mainland states of Australia except the Northern Territory. It is also found in New Zealand, but not naturally. The earliest New Zealand record is Auckland, 1898 (1990: 60)

References
  1990: Beetles in a suburban environment: a New Zealand case study. DSIR Plant Protection report, (3) PDF

External links

Coccinellidae
Beetles described in 1842